Kronan (Swedish: The Crown) bicycles are marketed by Kronan Trademark AB, also known as Kronan AB. Kronan AB  was established in June 1997 by three former-students, John Wahlbäck and the Avander brothers, Henry and Martin. In autumn 2003 the company was bought by the Brunstedt family with Mary Brunstedt as the company's current CEO.

History
Kronan began when John Wahlbäck sold surplus Swedish military m/42 bikes, to supplement his income as a student. They decided to manufacture a copy of this after selling all their original stock.  Kronan bought the original drawings from the Swedish Ministry of Defense and commissioned a Taiwanese manufacturer to build bicycles to these specifications.

The current Kronan Bicycle has been modernized slightly, but has the same basic design as the original. It is assembled in Poland using parts from Asia. The original Kronan factory was in Malmö.

Until about 2000 Kronan bikes were only available in a limited number of colors, with a single gear and coaster brakes.  New models have been added with 3-speed SRAM hub gears and drum brakes.  

Other variants include a child's bike (Kiddo), a traditionally-styled bike (Kranny) and a tricycle (Kargo). All these bikes have a bottle dynamo front light (the rear is operated by a battery) and panniers as standard.

Models

 Diamond Frame, single gear, coaster brake
 Diamond Frame, 3-speed, front roller brake, rear coaster brake
 Step-through, single gear, coaster brake
 Step-through, 3-speed, front roller brake, rear coaster brake
 Step-through Unitube, 5-speed, front roller brake, rear coaster brake (USA only - no longer available)

Specs

Frame: Cromoly diamond and step through with 1 or 3 three speeds
Forks: Cromoly
Wheels: Miche, aluminum
Rear hub: Shimano 1-spd or SRAM T 3-spd S3 Spectro with coaster brake.
Chain: KMC 108 links
Crankset: Shimano steel 46T
Pedals: Aluminum spindle
Tires: Continental 
 Men's bikes: 26 × 1½ × 2  (54-584) 650B
 Ladies' bikes: 28 × 1⅝ × 1¾ (47-622) 700C
Saddle: Cushioned w/ vinyl upholstery
Rear light: Darkness & motion activated. .06 watts. Stainless steel cover & cage
Front light: Front wheel Bottle dynamo generator - 6 volt, 3 watts
Brakes: Drum brake SRAM T3
Luggage carrier: Painted steel w/ 2 chrome spring clips and airpump holder. Pump included!
Bell: Stainless steel w/ Kronan logo
Fenders and chainguard
Colours: 
 Men's - blue, black, brown, and occasionally green, and red. 
 Ladies - red, pink and black.

All Kronan bicycles have following basic equipment: large tires for more comfort in the city, a rear license plate, extra large saddle, coaster brake and front hub brake (As of March 2007, all Kronan models are equipped with a hand brake), dynamo powered front and automatic rear light, rear rack (7 inches (18 cm) wide and 18 inches (46 cm) front to back), stainless steel chain and spokes, steel frame with extra coating for protection, and rims and fenders/mudguards in steel in same color as frame,  internal gear hubs, kick stand, bell, and air pump.

Accessories

 Frame mounted wheel lock
 Front rack - frame-mounted and measures 12.5 inches (32 cm) deep by 16.5 inches (42 cm) wide with 35 pound capacity.
 Front basket - wire or wicker
 Brooks brand  Saddles and bags
 GMG Dutch child seat
 RackPack Carradice Bags

Corporate advertising
Several companies have incorporated Kronan bicycles into their employees and customer reward programs, or purchased a fleet of Kronan bikes for use by employees and customers.  These bicycles usually have a signboard underneath their crosstube advertising the company.
 British Airways
 IKEA
 Volvo
 Body Shop
 Hennes & Mauritz
 ABB Group
 Wallpaper magazine
 Dagens Nyheter

See also
 Monark - manufacturers similar utility bikes
 Helkama Jääkäri - Finnish version

References

External links

 Kronan Cykel (Swedish)
 KronanUSA 
 Kronan Belgium 
 Kronan video on YouTube
 Kronan video in Spanish
 Kronan Classic 3-speed
 A small history of Bicycles in SWEDEN 
 Kronan nos enseñan sus fotos (Spanish)
 Bike Fixation

Cycle manufacturers of Sweden
Manufacturing companies established in 1997
Swedish brands